Forney could refer to:

People
 Alva Clark Forney, lieutenant governor of South Dakota
 Daniel Munroe Forney, US Representative from North Carolina
 David Forney, American electrical engineer 
 Ellen Forney, American cartoonist and educator
 James Forney, recipient of the Marine Corps Brevet Medal
 John H. Forney (1829-1902), American Confederate general in the Civil War
 John Weiss Forney,  American journalist and politician
 John W. Forney, US Secretary of the Senate
 Kynan Forney, former American football player
 Matthias N. Forney (1835-1908), US steam locomotive manufacturer
 Peter Forney, US Representative from North Carolina
 William H. Forney, US Representative from Alabama
 Andrew P. Forney, Beaker

Places
 Forney, Texas
 Forney Independent School District, school district based in Forney
 Forney High School, in Forney, Texas
 North Forney High School, in Forney, Texas
 Waynesville Regional Airport at Forney Field, formerly known as Forney Army Airfield
 Forney Ridge Trail, an American hiking trail
 Forney Transportation Museum, Denver, Colorado

Things
 Forney Aircoupe, a variant of the low wing metal monoplane ERCO Ercoupe
 Forney locomotive, a steam locomotive built to the design of Matthias N. Forney
 Forney algorithm, for calculating the error values at known error locations

See also
 Johann Heinrich Samuel Formey (1711-1797), German author who wrote in French as journalist, editor and encyclopedist